Jade Raymond (born 28 August 1975) is a Canadian video game creator, best known for helping create the Assassin's Creed and Watch Dogs franchises, and for building the Ubisoft Toronto and EA Motive Studios. On 16 March 2021, Raymond announced the founding of a new independent development team called Haven Studios, which was later acquired by Sony Interactive Entertainment in July 2022, officially becoming a part of PlayStation Studios.

Early life and career 
Jade Raymond was born 28 August 1975 in Montreal. She graduated from St. George's School of Montreal in 1992 and Marianopolis College in 1994. She received a Bachelor of Science degree from McGill University in 1998, where she majored in computer science.

Her first post-university job was as a programmer for Sony, where she eventually helped in the creation of Sony Online's first Research and Development group. This led to Electronic Arts where she worked as a producer on The Sims Online. From 2003–2004, Raymond joined the G4 program The Electric Playground as a part-time correspondent, working with Victor Lucas, Tommy Tallarico and Julie Stoffer. In 2004, she started working for Ubisoft Montreal, where she led the creation of the first Assassin's Creed game. Raymond went on to become executive producer on Assassin's Creed II, and was executive producer of new IP at Ubisoft Montreal, which included Watch Dogs and The Mighty Quest for Epic Loot.

In January 2010, Raymond moved to Toronto to build a new studio for Ubisoft in the role of managing director. Raymond is also on the Board of Directors of WIFTI, an organization dedicated the advancement of women across film, television and screen-based industries. In July 2015, Raymond announced that she had joined Electronic Arts and formed Motive Studios, based in Montreal. She was also to be in charge of Visceral Games studio, located in California, where she worked with games designer and writer Amy Hennig on Star Wars games, and also developed new original IP.

On January 9, 2018, Raymond was named to the Board of Directors for the Academy of Interactive Arts & Sciences. She left Motive Studios in October 2018, alluding to a "top secret project". In March 2019, Raymond announced that she had joined Google as a vice president; during the 2019 Game Developers Conference, Google affirmed that she would be heading Google's Studios, Stadia Games and Entertainment, to create exclusive content for Google's Stadia streaming service. 

In July 2018, Raymond was recognized for "her trailblazing endeavours across her 20-year career" with the Develop Vanguard Award. In October 2018, she received the Pioneer Award from the Fun & Serious Game Festival, recognizing her "contributions to the industry as a producer of games that are considered a turning point in the industry". Raymond was one of few video game executives named in the Variety 2018 and 2019 list of 500 most influential business leaders shaping the global entertainment industry.

On February 1, 2021, Raymond announced her departure from Stadia Games and Entertainment, as well as Google, concurrent with Google's announcement of the wind down for their in-house Stadia Games and Entertainment development studio. She founded Haven Studios, a new independent development studio, on March 16, 2021, with Sony Interactive Entertainment investing in the studio to create a new original IP for PlayStation. Almost a year later, on March 21, 2022, Sony Interactive Entertainment announced the acquisition of Haven Studios.

Games

References

External links 

 

1975 births
Anglophone Quebec people
Businesspeople from Montreal
Canadian people of Australian descent
Canadian television personalities
Electronic Arts employees
Google people
Living people
McGill University alumni
PlayStation Studios
Sony Interactive Entertainment people
Television personalities from Montreal
Ubisoft people
Video game businesspeople
Video game directors
Video game producers
Video game programmers
Women video game designers
Women video game programmers